The following Union Army and Confederate States Army units and commanders fought in the Battle of Glorieta Pass of the American Civil War.

Abbreviations used

Military rank
 Col = Colonel
 Ltc = Lieutenant Colonel
 Maj = Major
 Cpt = Captain
 Lt = 1st Lieutenant
 2Lt = 2nd Lieutenant

Union Army
Col John P. Slough

Flanking Column
Maj John M. Chivington

First Battalion (provisional)
Cpt William H. Lewis
5th U.S. Infantry, Company A: Lt Samuel Barr
5th U.S. Infantry, Company G: Lt Stephen Norvell
1st Colorado Infantry, Company B: Cpt Samuel M. Logan
Independent Company of Colorado Volunteers: Cpt James Hobart Ford
New Mexico Volunteers (detachment): Ltc Manuel Antonio Chaves

Second Battalion (provisional)
Cpt Edward W. Wynkoop
1st Colorado Infantry, Company A: 1st Lt. James R. Shaffer
1st Colorado Infantry, Company E: Cpt Scott J. Anthony
1st Colorado Infantry, Company H: Cpt George L. Sanborn

Main Column
Col John P. Slough
Field Battalion (provisional)
Ltc Samuel F. Tappan
1st Colorado Infantry, Company C: Cpt Richard Sopris
1st Colorado Infantry, Company D: Cpt Jacob Downing
1st Colorado Infantry, Company G: Cpt William F. Wilder
1st Colorado Infantry, Company I: Lt Charles Kerber
1st Colorado Infantry, Company K: Cpt Samuel H. Robbins
Heavy Battery: Cpt John F. Ritter
Light Battery: Lt Ira W. Claflin

Cavalry Reserve
Col John P. Slough
3rd U.S. Cavalry, Company C: Cpt George W. Howland
3rd U.S. Cavalry, Company E: Cpt Charles J. Walker
1st Colorado, Company F: Cpt Samuel H. Cook

Confederate Army
Ltc William Read Scurry

2nd Texas Mounted Rifles: Maj Charles L. Pyron
4th Texas Mounted Volunteers: Maj Henry W. Raguet
5th Texas Mounted Volunteers: Maj John S. Shropshire
7th Texas Mounted Volunteers: Maj Powhatan Jordan

Independent Attached Units
Arizona Rangers: 2Lt William Simmons
Brigands (Santa Fe Gamblers): Cpt John G. Phillips
San Elizario Spy Company: Lt J. R. Parsons

Artillery Battery: 2Lt James Bradford

References
 Alberts, Don E. The Battle of Glorieta: Union Victory in the West (College Station, TX:  Texas A&M University Press), 1998.  
 Edrington, Thomas S. & John Taylor. The Battle of Glorieta Pass: A Gettysburg in the West, March 26–28, 1862 (Albuquerque, NM:  University of New Mexico Press), 1998.  

American Civil War orders of battle